Walter Balmer (28 March 1948 – 27 December 2010) was a Swiss international footballer.

Club career
Balmer started his youth football with his local team in Thun. He played as a right winger for FC Thun between 1964 and 1968. Between 1969 and 1976 he played for FC Basel in the Nationalliga A and won four league titles in the years 1969, 1970, 1972 and 1973. In the 1975 Swiss Cup Final Balmer scored the winning goal five minutes before the end of overtime. Balmer also won the first edition of the Swiss League Cup in 1972 with Basel.

International career
Between the years 1969 and 1973 Balmer played 20 games for the Swiss national team in which he scored two goals. In 1971, he scored during the 4–0 win against Turkey and in 1972 during the 1–1 draw with Denmark.

On 28 June 1976 Balmer (aged just 28 years) retired from his semi-professional football career and from then on he worked as a teacher in the Gymnasium in Interlaken and also as a sport journalist.

Honours
Basel
 Swiss League champion: 1969, 1970, 1972 1973
 Swiss Cup winner: 1975
 Swiss League Cup winner: 1972
 Coppa delle Alpi winner: 1969, 1970
 Uhrencup winner: 1969, 1970

References

1948 births
2010 deaths
FC Thun players
FC Basel players
Swiss men's footballers
Switzerland international footballers
Association football forwards
People from Thun
People from Interlaken
Sportspeople from the canton of Bern